Beng may refer to:

People
 Aaron Beng, Singaporean rear-admiral, Chief of Navy since 2020
 Kwek Leng Beng (born 1941), Singaporean billionaire
 Lim Eng Beng (1951–2015), former Philippine Basketball Association player
 Su Beng (1918–2019), Taiwanese dissident and political activist
 Beng Chin Ooi, Singaporean computer scientist
 Beng Climaco (born 1966), Filipino politician
 Beng Spies, voice actor

Other uses
 Beng District, Oudomxay Province, Laos
 Beng, Razavi Khorasan, a village in Razavi Khorasan Province, Iran
 Beng language, a language in Côte d'Ivoire